The Songtao Reservoir, also known as the Songtao Reservoir Irrigation Area, is the largest body of water in Hainan, and the second largest reservoir in China.

The reservoir contains more than 100 islands, and is used for agriculture, fisheries, and tourism.

References

External links
Image
Images

Tourist attractions in Hainan
Reservoirs in China
Bodies of water of Hainan